Below is a list of actors and actresses that are part of the voice cast of the American 3D CGI animated television series Star Wars: The Clone Wars and its corresponding film.

The show's main voice actors have included: Matt Lanter, James Arnold Taylor, Ashley Eckstein, Dee Bradley Baker, Catherine Taber, Tom Kane, Anthony Daniels, Ben Burtt, Ian Abercrombie, Corey Burton, Terrence C. Carson, Nika Futterman, and Matthew Wood.

Actors from the live-action films who returned to reprise their roles for the show include: Wood as the B1 Battle Droids and General Grievous, Ahmed Best as Jar Jar Binks (although Binks was voiced by Phil LaMarr in three early episodes), Daniels as C-3PO, Burtt as R2-D2, Chewbacca, and Darth Vader's breaths, Daniel Logan as the young clone trooper cadets and Boba Fett, Liam Neeson as Qui-Gon Jinn, and Pernilla August as Shmi Skywalker, respectively. Additionally, Samuel L. Jackson and Christopher Lee reprised the roles of Mace Windu and Count Dooku in the animated film, respectively, but not in the television series.

Actors who appear by original recordings from Revenge of the Sith to represent their characters in the final season episode "Shattered" include: Hayden Christensen as Anakin Skywalker, Jackson as Mace Windu and Ian McDiarmid as Palpatine. The characters of Ahsoka and Darth Maul appear by motion capture of Lauren Mary Kim and Ray Park—who reprises his role from The Phantom Menace—in the episode "The Phantom Apprentice", whilst Eckstein and Sam Witwer retain the voice talent.

Cast

Notes

See also 
 List of Star Wars cast members

References

External links 
 Full cast and crew of Star Wars: The Clone Wars at the Internet Movie Database

 
Lists of actors by science fiction television series
Clone Wars cast
Lists of characters in American television animation